Miss Venezuela 1966 was the 13th edition of Miss Venezuela pageant held at Teatro del Este in Caracas, Venezuela, on June 14, 1966, after weeks of events. The winner of the pageant was Magaly Castro Egui, Miss Guárico.

The pageant was broadcast live by RCTV

Results
 Miss Venezuela 1966 - Magaly Castro Egui (Miss Guárico)
 1st runner-up - Jeannette Kopp (Miss Distrito Federal)
 2nd runner-up - Cecilia Picón (Miss Mérida)
 3rd runner-up - Ella Ploch (Miss Departamento Vargas)
 4th runner-up - Maria Mercedes Zambrano (Miss Lara)

Special awards
 Miss Fotogénica (Miss Photogenic) - Maria Mercedes Zambrano (Miss Lara)
 Miss Amistad (Miss Friendship) - Ella Ploch (Miss Departamento Vargas)
 Miss Sonrisa (Best Smile) - Nelly Pérez (Miss Sucre)

Delegates

 Miss Anzoátegui - Glenda Guerrero Marcano
 Miss Bolívar - Beatriz Adrián Adrián
 Miss Departamento Vargas - Ella Charlotte Ploch Vargas
 Miss Distrito Federal - Jeannette Kopp  Arenas
 Miss Guárico - Magaly Castro Egui
 Miss Lara - Maria Mercedes Zambrano Ramos
 Miss Mérida - Cecilia Picón Febres
 Miss Monagas - Luisa Rodríguez Garantón
 Miss Nueva Esparta - Vivian Blanco Fombona
 Miss Sucre - Nelly Pérez Astudillo
 Miss Táchira - Mireya Bernal Niño
 Miss Zulia - Rosalinda Velásquez Acosta

External links
 Miss Venezuela official website

1966 beauty pageants
1966 in Venezuela